Gradišče pri Trebnjem is a village in the Municipality of Trebnje in eastern Slovenia. The area is part of the historical region of Lower Carniola. The municipality is now included in the Southeast Slovenia Statistical Region.

Name
The name of the settlement was changed from Gradišče to Gradišče pri Trebnjem in 1953.

Cultural heritage
A prehistoric hillfort dated to the late Bronze Age has been identified at the settlement. The name Gradišče itself suggests the existence of a fortified prehistoric settlement, and an archaeological survey in 1989 confirmed and dated the site.

In 1936 a chapel dedicated to Saint Joseph was built in the settlement.

References

External links

Gradišče pri Trebnjem at Geopedia

Populated places in the Municipality of Trebnje